Big pond may refer to:

Big Pond (Massachusetts), a lake in Massachusetts
Big Pond (Orange County, New York), a lake in New York
Big Pond, Nova Scotia, a Canadian township
Big Pond (Nova Scotia), the lake after which the township is named
Big Pond, Pennsylvania, an unincorporated village in Bradford County, USA
BigPond, an Australian Internet service provider
The Big Pond, a 1930s romantic comedy film
Big Pond (Middle Caicos, Turks and Caicos Islands), a lake in Middle Caicos